Mount Zion Methodist Church, or variations, may refer to:

In the United States (by state)
 Mt. Zion Methodist Church (Carthage, Arkansas), listed on the National Register of Historic Places (NRHP) in Arkansas
Mount Zion Methodist Episcopal Church (Eaton, Indiana), listed on the NRHP in Indiana
Old Zion Methodist Church (Park City, Kentucky), listed on the NRHP in Kentucky
 Mount Zion Methodist Church (Neshoba County, Mississippi), the Black church whose burning the future Mississippi Burning murder victims planned to investigate 
 Mount Zion Methodist Church (Somers, New York), listed on the NRHP in New York
Mount Zion Methodist Episcopal Church South (Fall River, Tennessee), listed on the NRHP in Tennessee
 Mt. Zion Methodist Church (Brenham, Texas), listed on the NRHP in Texas
Zion Methodist Church (Norfolk, Virginia), listed on the NRHP in Virginia

See also
Mount Zion Church (disambiguation)
Mount Zion Methodist Episcopal Church (disambiguation)
Mount Zion African Methodist Episcopal Church (disambiguation)